Isle of Wight is an unincorporated community in and the county seat of Isle of Wight County, Virginia, United States. Originally, Isle of Wight County was named  Warrosquyoake Shire. This was changed to the current name of Isle of Wight in 1637.

References

County seats in Virginia
Unincorporated communities in Isle of Wight County, Virginia
Unincorporated communities in Virginia